Hi-Rock were a Thai rock band famous and popular especially in the 1990s.

History
The band was formed in 1984 by Anurak "Tui" Yingnakhon (ตุ้ย: อนุรักษ์ ยิ่งนคร) and Seri "Mac" Vihokhean (แม็ก: เสรี วิหคเหิน) and brought together musicians to add more. The name "Hi-Rock" comes from playing regularly at Rock Pub and the owner was the name given to.

Later, when the lead vocalist has resigned, the band has Surat "Pe" Tabwang (เป้: สุรัช ทับวัง) backed up.

Hi-Rock played their first public appearance in mid year 1989 with a back-up band for Pathomporn Pathomporn (ปฐมพร ปฐมพร) at Ramkhamhaeng University among tens of thousands of attendances. At that time, they were asked to change the name to Pisaj temporarily. Later they signed with RS Promotion with the persuasion of the scout Thanapol "Suea" Intharit (เสือ: ธนพล อินทฤทธิ์).

Hi-Rock achieved immediate success with the release of their first studio album Khon Pan Rock in 1990, dressed in a colorful costume, eye makeup, inspired by Cinderella and Loudness.

Hi-Rock  has released three studio albums in 1991, 1993 and 1996. Before Tabwang quit in 1997, the band changed name to HIROCKSHIMA and replaced the new lead vocalist. But they were not as successful as in the past.

Members
Current members
 Pornprom "An" Pumsawas (อั๋น: พรพรหม พุ่มสวัสดิ์): Lead vocalist
 Purish "Jon" Sukarom (จ้อน: ภูริช สุขารมณ์): Bass
 Rangsan "Kob" Wongsak (กบ: รังสรรค์ วงศ์ศักดิ์): Bass
 Tok (ต็อก): bass
 Seri "Mac" Vihokhoen (แม็ก: เสรี วิหคเหิน): Keyboards
 Anurak "Tui" Yingnakhon (ตุ้ย: อนุรักษ์ ยิ่งนคร): Guitar
 Damrongsith "Pingpong" Srinak (ปิงปอง: ดำรงสิทธิ์ ศรีนาค): Drums
Former members
Surat "Pe" Tabwang (เป้: สุรัช ทับวัง): Lead vocalist
Pacharawat "Tom" Banthon (ทอม: พชรวัฒน์ บรรทอน): Lead vocalist (only in single Kue Niran in 2013)
Watchara "Tom" Chandrabutr (ต้อม: วัชระ จันทรบุตร): Keyboards (only fourth studio album)
Warawut "Tong" Panitkul (โต้ง: วรวุธ พานิชกุล): Guitar (special)
Kitisak "Toei" Kongsamai (เต้ย: กิติศักดิ์ คงสมัย): Drums (only first studio album and single Kue Niran; died on July 8, 2017 from liver cancer, aged 52 years)

Discography
Studio albums
คนพันธุ์ร็อก (Khon Pan Rock; 1990)
บัญญัติผ่าแปด (Banyat Pa Paed; 1991)
เจ็บกว่านี้มีอีกไหม (Jeb Khwa Nee Mee Eek Mai; 1993)
เอชไอวี (H IV; 1996)

References

External links
 

Thai heavy metal musical groups
Musical groups established in 1984
Musical groups from Bangkok